The Corvallis Knights, founded as the Aloha Knights, are a collegiate summer baseball team located in Corvallis, Oregon.  Founded in 1990 in Beaverton by Dan and his brother Joe Segel, the Knights moved to Corvallis from Gresham in 2007. They play in the West Coast League, a college summer wood-bat league where college players and prospects prepare for the pros.  The league comprises teams from British Columbia, Oregon and Washington.  Corvallis plays its home games at Goss Stadium, also the home of the Oregon State Beavers.

The Knights are named after Penny Knight, their top sponsor.  Penny is married to Nike co-founder Phil Knight.

History

2014
The Corvallis Knights put up 35 wins and 19 losses in the 2014 WCL season. The Knights tried to retake their WCL Championship throne but fell short of the title by one game. Corvallis forced the third-ever Game 3 of the WCL Championship Series. The Knights put up Michael Lucarelli and Grant Melker for 54 games tying the WCL record for the most games with a batting appearance—tying Mitchell Gunsolus of the Wenatchee Applesox from 2012 and Cole Norton from the Kitsap Bluejackets in 2011. Also, Grant Melker set the WCL record for the most bases stolen by one player in one season with 29 steals. The Corvallis Knights hit 95 doubles in the 2014 season, setting the record for the most doubles by any one team in one year. They also set the record for the most sacrifice flies and stolen bases, hitting 39 flies and stealing 119 bases in one season, respectively. The Knights kept the records rolling with Jackson Lockwood winning eight games, tying the record of Eli Morgon of the Yakima Valley Pippins in the same year. Corvallis sold 43,938 tickets in the season and hosted 1,292 fans one night.

2015

On February 12, 2015, the Corvallis Knights held a re-branding party and unveiled the new logo for the club. According to logo designer Jason Klein of the San Diego graphic design company Brandiose, the new team logo includes a head of grain as a tribute to the agricultural heritage of the Willamette Valley and the regional affinity for craft brewing. Concurrent with the change, the team officially adopted two new team colors in addition to its traditional cardinal — gold and a pale maize tone described by team officials as "Corvallis cream."

2022
The Knights finished the 2022 regular season first in the South Division with a 39-15 record, the best in the league. The Knights defeated the Pippins 2-1 in the South Division Semifinals and will host the Raptors in the South Division Final. Kiko Romero is sixth in the WCL in runs batted in (34) while Sean Wiese has five wins on the mound. The Knights have seen 61,390 total fans go through the gate.

Season Records

Alumni Currently in Major League Baseball

 Tyler Anderson – LHP, Los Angeles Dodgers
 Matt Andriese – RHP, Boston Red Sox
 Matt Boyd – LHP, Detroit Tigers
 Matthew Duffy – IF, Chicago Cubs
 Mitch Haniger – OF, Seattle Mariners
 Jace Fry – LHP, Chicago White Sox
Nick Madrigal – IF, Chicago Cubs

Media

The Knights are broadcast live on Corvallis' KEJO 1240 AM.

Footnotes

External links
 Corvallis Knights official website
 West Coast League official website

Amateur baseball teams in Oregon
Sports in Corvallis, Oregon
Baseball teams established in 1990
1990 establishments in Oregon